Eraserheads: The Reunion Concert The Movie is a film of the historical reunion concert of the Filipino alternative rock band Eraserheads on August 30, 2008. It was shown in theater on November 26, 2008, twenty-three days after the releasing of the DVD copy.

Story
The band started the historical reunion concert with their song "Alapaap".

Awards

References

2008 films
Filipino-language films
Concert films
Video albums by Filipino artists